Diana Chang (1924 – February 19, 2009) was a Chinese American novelist and poet. She is best known for her novel The Frontiers of Love, one of the earliest novels by an Asian American woman. She is considered to be the first American-born Chinese to publish a novel in the United States.

Early life

Chang was born in New York City to a Chinese father, Kuang Chi Chang, and Eurasian mother, Eva Mary Lee Wah Chang, but spent her youngest years in China, including Beijing, Nanjing, and Shanghai. She attended high school in New York, and graduated cum laude from Barnard College in 1949 where she majored in English, focusing on British and American Poets. While an undergraduate at Barnard, Chang had 3 of her poems published by Poetry Magazine, including her work "At The Window."

Career 
After graduation, Chang worked as a book editor at three reputable publishing houses: Avon Books, Bobbs-Merrill, A. A. Wyn). She also worked as the editor for the PEN-sponsored journal American Pen and as a creative writing teacher at Barnard College.

Literary work 
Chang's best known work is The Frontiers of Love. Her work has more recently been read in terms of postmodernity and hybridity. Although critical work on Chang has increased since the republication of Frontiers, critics have preferred to examine her Asian-themed works; her "white" novels are only recently getting attention.
While at Barnard College, Chang published her poem, Mood in Modern Poetry Association's Poetry.

Personal life 
Chang lived in Water Mill, NY with her husband David Hermann.

She died on February 19, 2009.

Published works

Novels
The Frontiers of Love, (1956, reissued 1974)
A Woman of Thirty (1959)
A Passion for Life (1961)
The Only Game in Town (1963)
Eye to Eye (1974)
A Perfect Love (1978)

Poetry
 Saying Yes (Unknown)
The Horizon is Definitely Speaking (1982)
What Matisse is After (1984)
Earth Water Light (1991)

Awards
Fulbright
John Hay Whitney Opportunity Fellowship
Mademoiselle Magazine Woman-of-the-Year

See also

List of Asian American writers

References

Further reading
Baringer, Sandra. "'The Hybrids and the Cosmopolitans': Race, Gender, and Masochism in Diana Chang's The Frontiers of Love"  pp. 107–21 IN: Brennan, Jonathan (ed. and introd.); Mixed Race Literature. Stanford, CA: Stanford UP; 2002.
Fink, Thomas; "Chang's 'Plunging into View'"  Explicator, 1997 Spring; 55 (3): 175–77.
Grice, Helena. "Diana Chang"  pp. 30–35 IN: Madsen, Deborah L. (ed. and introd.); Asian American Writers. Detroit, MI: Gale; 2005.
Grice, Helena. "Face-ing/De-Face-ing Racism: Physiognomy as Ethnic Marker in Early Eurasian/Amerasian Women's Texts"  pp. 255–70 IN: Lee, Josephine (ed.); Lim, Imogene L. (ed.); Matsukawa, Yuko (ed.); Re/Collecting Early Asian America: Essays in Cultural History. Philadelphia, PA: Temple UP; 2002.
Ling, Amy; "Writer in the Hyphenated Condition: Diana Chang"  MELUS, 1980 Winter; 7 (4): 69–83.
Spaulding, Carol Vivian; Blue-Eyed Asians: Eurasianism in the Work of Edith Eaton/Sui Sin Far, Winnifred Eaton/Onoto Watanna, and Diana Chang.  Dissertation Abstracts International, Section A: The Humanities and Social Sciences, 1997 Jan; 57 (7): 3024–25. U of Iowa, 1996.
Wu, Wei-hsiung Kitty; Cultural Ideology and Aesthetic Choices: A Study of Three Works by Chinese-American Women—Diana Chang, Bette Bao Lord, and Maxine H. Kingston.'  Dissertation Abstracts International, 1990 June; 50 (12): 3956A.

20th-century American novelists
American writers of Chinese descent
American women writers of Chinese descent
1934 births
2009 deaths
Barnard College alumni
American novelists of Chinese descent
American women poets
American women novelists
20th-century American women writers
20th-century American poets
21st-century American women